Charles Lloyd-Pack (10 October 1902 – 22 December 1983) was a British film, television and stage actor.

Life and career
Lloyd-Pack was born at Wapping, East London, to working-class parents. He was seen in several horror films produced by the Hammer Studios including Dracula, The Man Who Could Cheat Death, The Revenge of Frankenstein, The Terror of the Tongs and Quatermass 2, the film version of the 1955 BBC TV serial. In 1970 he appeared as Claud Nau at the Chichester Festival Theatre in Robert Bolt's play, Vivat! Vivat Regina!. His best known role was Professor Marks in the British television series Strange Report but he is also known from other television appearances in The Avengers, Man in a Suitcase, Randall & Hopkirk, The Adventures of Robin Hood, The Prisoner and the mini-series Jennie: Lady Randolph Churchill (1974).

Personal life and death
Lloyd-Pack married Viennese Jewish refugee Ulrike Elisabeth Pulay (25 April 1921 – 8 April 2000), a travel agent and later founder of a kindergarten, in 1941 and was the father of actor Roger Lloyd-Pack and stage manager Christopher Lloyd-Pack. His grandchildren include actress Emily Lloyd.

Lloyd-Pack died aged 81, on 22 December 1983, in London.

Filmography

Film

Television

References

External links

Charles Lloyd-Pack at the British Film Institute
Charles Lloyd-Pack (Aveleyman)

1902 births
1983 deaths
20th-century English male actors
English male film actors
English male television actors
Male actors from London
Alumni of RADA